Jovin may refer to:
 Jovin Bedic (born 1990), Filipino footballer
 Milan Jovin (born 1955), Serbian footballer
 Suzanne Jovin (19771998), Yale University student murdered in 1998
 Jovin, Iran (disambiguation), villages in Iran